Dejadisc was a roots music-oriented record label based in Austin, Texas which was active from 1992 to 1997. It was known for the numerous, eclectic singer-songwriters who were signed to it.

History
Dejadisc was founded by Steve Wilkison in 1992. In 1995, the label released Richard Buckner's debut album, Bloomed. Buckner subsequently left the label to release his next album, Devotion + Doubt, on MCA Records. In 1997, he claimed that he hadn't made any money from Bloomed, and that Wilkison would not return the master tapes from the album to him. Wilkison replied that he has paid Buckner in the past, and has never tried to hide the amount of money he owes him. In 1996, Wilkison announced that he was relocating the label's offices to Nashville, Tennessee. In February 1997, Wilkison told Billboard that he was putting the label on hiatus. The label went out of business later that year.

Artists
Artists who released one or more albums on DejaDisc included:
Richard Buckner
Michael Hall
Rainravens
Ray Wylie Hubbard
Michael Fracasso
Elliott Murphy
Jo Carol Pierce
Wayne Hancock
Shoulders
David Lewis

References

Record labels established in 1992
Record labels disestablished in 1997
1992 establishments in Texas
1997 disestablishments in Texas
Rock record labels
Companies based in Austin, Texas
Companies based in Nashville, Tennessee